This is a list of articles of notable condominiums located in Canada.

Residential condominiums

Condo hotels

See also
 List of condominiums in the United States

References

condominiums
condominiums